In Hawaiian mythology, Nu'u was a man who built an ark with which he escaped a Great Flood. He landed his vessel on top of Mauna Kea on the Big Island.  Nu'u mistakenly attributed his safety to the moon, and made sacrifices to it. Kāne, the creator god, descended to earth on a rainbow and explained Nu'u's mistake. The myth has been interpreted as depicting the hazards of the Oceanian environment and local peoples' ability to withstand them. Missionaries to Hawaii in the 19th century considered him analogous to Noah of the Bible.

References

External links
Hawaiian Mythology by Martha Beckwith
 Dictionary of World Mythology, Arthur Cotterell reference is also viewable on Google Books without subscription: https://books.google.com/books?id=ExuhmHX4dUEC&q=nu%27u#v=snippet&q=nu'u&f=false

Hawaiian mythology
Flood myths